Kazi Faruque Kader is a Bangladeshi Jatiya Party politician and the former Member of Parliament from Nilphamari-3.

Career
Kader was nominated from Nilphamari-3 constituency in 2008 as a candidate of Jatiya Party of the Grand Alliance. He was elected to parliament in 2008. He lost the 2014 election to Golam Mostofa, Bangladesh Awami League candidate.

Personal life
Kader's father, Kazi Abdul Kader, was a government minister of Pakistan. He was the Food & Agriculture Minister of the erstwhile East Pakistan government and a leader of the Convention Muslim League.

References

Bangladesh Jatiya Party politicians
Living people
9th Jatiya Sangsad members
Year of birth missing (living people)